Marc Anthony Klok (born 20 April 1993) is a professional footballer who plays as a midfielder for Liga 1 club Persib Bandung and the Indonesia national team. Born in Netherlands, he obtained Indonesia citizenship through naturalization.

Klok began his career at Utrecht. In 2013, he signed with Scottish Premiership club Ross County. After one season in Scotland, Klok joined Cherno More Varna where he won one Bulgarian Cup and one Bulgarian Supercup. After leaving Cherno More at the end of the 2015–16 season, he joined Oldham Athletic.

Club career

In Europe
Born in Amsterdam, Klok signed for Scottish side Ross County from FC Utrecht in June 2013 and made his debut in the 4–1 home defeat to Celtic on 9 November. He was released in August 2014 after only six appearances. 

Two months later Klok signed a contract with Bulgarian club Cherno More Varna. He made his debut in a 2–0 away loss against Ludogorets Razgrad on 25 October and scored his first goal for the club in a 7–1 away victory against Pirin Razlog for Bulgarian Cup on 23 September 2015.

In July 2016, Klok signed a six-month contract with League One side Oldham Athletic. He made his competitive debut in a 3–0 away loss at Millwall on 6 August, coming on as a substitute for Ollie Banks.

Klok went on trial with Dundee in January 2017 and signed a short-term contract on 31 January. He left Dundee in April 2017, having made two appearances for the club.

In Indonesia
In April 2017, Klok joined Indonesian club PSM Makassar of the Liga 1. He made his debut in a 1–1 away draw against Mitra Kukar on 24 April 2017, and scored his first goal in a 2–0 win against Persipura Jayapura on 3 June 2017.

In January 2020 Klok signed a four year contract with Persija Jakarta, but two months later the season was suspended due to the COVID-19 pandemic and later declared void.

Klok moved to Persib Bandung in June 2021 . He scored on his league debut, a 1–0 win against Barito Putera on 4 September 2021.

International career

After five years of playing in Indonesia and undergoing a complicated naturalization process, Klok represented his second country as one of the overaged players in the Indonesia U23 team at the 2021 SEA Games. He played in all of the six matches, including a bronze medal match against Malaysia U23 that ended with a victory for Indonesia through penalty shootouts. Klok scored the last and decisive shot.

On 1 June 2022, Klok earned his first senior cap in a friendly match against Bangladesh that ended 0–0. He was appointed as the captain of the team in the second half after the captain Fachruddin Aryanto was replaced at halftime.

On 8 June 2022, Klok scored his first senior goal in a 2023 AFC Asian Cup qualification match against Kuwait, converted a penalty kick in 2–1 win.

On 24 September 2022, Klok scored a goal in a friendly match against Curaçao in a 3–2 win.

Klok was called up for the 2022 AFF Championship with Indonesia on 19 December 2022. He scored twice, against Brunei, and Thailand in the tournament.

Personal life
Klok is the nephew of former De Graafschap, Dunfermline Athletic and Motherwell footballer Rob Matthaei.

Career statistics

Club

International

International goals

Honours

PFC Cherno More Varna
 Bulgarian Cup: 2015
 Bulgarian Supercup: 2015

PSM Makassar
 Piala Indonesia: 2019

Persija Jakarta
 Menpora Cup: 2021

Indonesia Olympic
 Southeast Asian Games Bronze medal: 2021

Individual
 AFC Cup Best Goal: 2019
 Liga 1 Team of the Season: 2019 (Substitutes)
Menpora Cup Best Player: 2021
 Menpora Cup Best Eleven: 2021

References

External links
 
 Marc Klok interview at elfvoetbal.nl

1993 births
Living people
Footballers from Amsterdam
Indonesian footballers
Indonesia international footballers
Dutch footballers
Dutch emigrants to Indonesia
Indonesian people of Dutch descent
FC Utrecht players
Ross County F.C. players
PFC Cherno More Varna players
Oldham Athletic A.F.C. players
Dundee F.C. players
PSM Makassar players
Persija Jakarta players
Persib Bandung players
Dutch expatriate footballers
Dutch expatriate sportspeople in Scotland
Expatriate footballers in Scotland
Dutch expatriate sportspeople in Bulgaria
Expatriate footballers in Bulgaria
Dutch expatriate sportspeople in England
Expatriate footballers in England
Dutch expatriate sportspeople in Indonesia
Expatriate footballers in Indonesia
Scottish Professional Football League players
First Professional Football League (Bulgaria) players
English Football League players
Liga 1 (Indonesia) players
Association football midfielders
Naturalised citizens of Indonesia
Competitors at the 2021 Southeast Asian Games
Southeast Asian Games bronze medalists for Indonesia
Southeast Asian Games medalists in football